The cerebellar veins are veins which drain the cerebellum. They consist of the superior cerebellar veins and the inferior cerebellar veins (dorsal cerebellar veins). The superior cerebellar veins drain to the straight sinus and the internal cerebral veins. The inferior cerebellar veins drain to the transverse sinus, the superior petrosal sinus, and the occipital sinus.

Structure 
The superior cerebellar veins pass partly forward and medialward, across the superior cerebellar vermis. They end in the straight sinus, and the internal cerebral veins, partly lateralward to the transverse and superior petrosal sinuses.

The inferior cerebellar veins are larger. They end in the transverse sinus, the superior petrosal sinus, and the occipital sinus.

Clinical significance 
The cerebellar veins may be affected by infarction or thrombosis. They may be the draining site of abnormal fistulas.

Additional images

References

External links 
 http://neuroangio.org/venous-brain-anatomy/veins-posterior-fossa/

Veins of the head and neck